Ninja Cheerleaders is a 2008 comedy film written and directed by David Presley.

Plot
A ninja sensei Hiroshi (George Takei) must be rescued by his three cheerleader/stripper students April (Ginny Weirick), Courtney (Trishelle Cannatella) and Monica (Maitland McConnell) from a mafia boss Victor Lazzaro (Michael Paré) and his evil ninja girlfriend Kinji (Natasha Chang).

Cast
The film also features Jason Ellis, Eric Stonestreet, and Max Perlich in secondary and third-tier roles. Richard Davalos appears in his last film role as Don Lazzaro.

Reception
In 2011, UGO Networks featured the film on their list of 25 Hot Ninja Girls, calling it "just an excuse for hot women to do martial arts".

References

External links
 
 Ninja Cheerleaders - TarsTarkas.NET

2008 films
2008 comedy films
Cheerleading films
Ninja films
Ninja parody
American martial arts comedy films
American comedy films
Remakes of American films
2008 martial arts films
Japan in non-Japanese culture
2000s English-language films
2000s American films